Ardath Frances Hurst Mayhar (February 20, 1930 – February 1, 2012) was an American writer and poet. Mayhar wrote over 60 books ranging from science fiction to horror to young adult to historical to westerns,  Some of her novels appeared under pseudonyms such as Frank Cannon, Frances Hurst, and John Killdeer.  Mayhar began writing fantasy with a story in 1973, and fantasy novels in 1979 after returning with her family to Texas from Oregon.

Mayhar also shared her knowledge of the skills of writing with many people through the Writer's Digest correspondence courses, and via her acclaimed book Through a Stone Wall: Lessons from Thirty Years of Writing.

Personal life
Mayhar was born at Timpson, Texas, and was first inspired to write by finding Arthur Merritt's fantasy The Face in the Abyss (1931) on a remote rural news-stand at age 15. Her early life story can be found in full in her autobiography Strange View from a Skewed Orbit, but a few years after going full-time as a fantasy and science-fiction writer she summed up her life for the biographical encyclopedia for libraries, Something about the author (1985).  There she stated that:

"I have spent most of my adult life shovelling manure, writing poetry, and looking up at the stars. ... hand-to-hand (sometimes face-to-hoof) with the cows, the cruddy milking machines, the manure, the hay, the weather. ... At the age of forty-three, I ‘reformed’ ... I finally realized that English teachers have destroyed any love of poetry that might remain in the English-speaking race ... so I started writing fantasy novels, and haven’t looked back in the years since. I have been influenced, to a greater or lesser extent, by Charles Dickens, Shakespeare, Ayn Rand, Andre Norton, William Faulkner, and all the ‘old heads’ in the science fiction field."

Mayhar escaped from the dairy farm to run a bookstore. She owned and operated The View From Orbit Bookstore in Nacogdoches, Texas, with her husband Joe. She later sold the bookstore, which served the students of Stephen F. Austin State University and people in the East Texas area, providing a wide variety of books and literature as well as Joe's computer services that would otherwise have been unavailable to the region at that time.

Work
She moved back to Texas to become an active fantasy and science-fiction writer, and lived on a place bordering the Attoyac River as it entered the Sam Rayburn Lake, which is in the Big Thicket country (today just outside the official Big Thicket National Preserve). The imaginative work she produced at that time has been compared to that of Andre Norton and Clifford Simak. Like Simak she often places rural people of straightforward decency into strange situations. Her fantasy stories have often been compared to Lord Dunsany for their delicacy and settings.

Her juvenile novels (what would now be called 'young adult') were sharply divided between her 'East Texas' series with regional settings, and her fantasy works for that age-group. She often featured strong-minded and morally-certain adolescent girl heroines at a time when it was not fashionable to do so.  This focus arose simply from her own background, not from politics.

Until her health began to fail, her reputation was such that she still spoke regularly in the area, drawing large crowds whenever she taught and spoke. She also attended occasional fan conventions, where she was treated like royalty by great writers such as Harlan Ellison:

"the transformation that came over Ellison [when he saw Mayhar walk in at Aggiecon 2000] was immediate and dramatic. He dropped everything and literally doted on Ardath. He got her a seat, brought her into the conversation and went out of his way to defer to her."

Her work was also acclaimed by noted author Andre Norton, and Joe R. Lansdale wrote simply: "Ardath Mayhar writes damn fine books!"

Papers
The main collection of her papers is the Ardath Mayhar Papers at the East Texas Research Center of the Stephen F. Austin State University. There is also an Ardath Mayhar Papers collection at The University of Southern Mississippi.

Awards
Mayhar was nominated for the Mark Twain Award, and won the Balrog Award for a horror narrative poem in Masques I, and had numerous other nominations for awards in almost every fiction genre, and won many awards for poetry.

Bibliography
She was the author or co-author of:

Poetry collections
Journey to an Ending
Reflections
Novels (science fiction) 
The World Ends in Hickory Hollow
Monkey Station: The Macaque Cycle, Book One †
Trail of the Seahawks: The Macaque Cycle, Book Two †
Messengers in White
A Planet Called Heaven
Shock Treatment
Exile on Vlahi
Khi to Freedom
The Snowlost
Novels (fantasy)
How the Gods Wove in Kyrannon: Tales of the Triple Moons
Makra Choria: A Novel of High Fantasy
A Road of Stars: A Fantasy of Life, Death, Love
Soul-Singer of Tyrnos (Tyrnos cycle)
Runes of the Lyre (Tyrnos cycle)
Exiles of Damaria: Riddles and Dreams
Exiles of Damaria: Ships & Seekers
The Saga of Grittel Sundotha (comedy fantasy)
The Wall (supernatural fantasy)
The Tulpa
Two-moons and the Black Tower
Witchfire †

Juvenile novels (East Texas settings)
The Absolutely Perfect Horse: A Novel of East Texas (with Marylois Dunn)
Medicine Walk
Timber Pirates (with Marylois Dunn)
Carrots and Miggle: a novel of East Texas
The Dropouts: growing up in East Texas
The Lintons of Skillet Bend
Juvenile novels (science fiction)
A Place of Silver Silence (for 9-10 year olds)
Juvenile novels (fantasy) 
Lords of the Triple Moons (Triple Moons, first in the juvenile series)
Seekers of Shar-Nuhn (Triple Moons series)
Warlock's Gift: A Novel of High Fantasy (Triple Moons series)
 The Door in the Hill (for 9-10 year olds)
Novels (prehistoric America)
Hunters of the Plains
The Island in the Lake
Passage West
People of the Mesa
Towers of the Earth
Continuation series novels
Golden Dream: A Fuzzy Odyssey (continuation of H. Beam Piper's Fuzzy series)
The Sword and the Dagger (an addition to the Battletech series)
The Body in the Swamp (Washington Shipp mystery #2)

Novels (westerns)
Feud At Sweetwater Creek
Bloody Texas Trail (as 'Frank Cannon')
Blood Kin (as 'John Killdeer')
High Mountain Winter: A Novel of the Old West
Vendetta: A Novel of the Old West
 Texas Gunsmoke
The Untamed
Wild Country
Wilderness Rendezvous
Prescription for Danger
Medicine Dream
Suspense and mystery
Deadly Memoir
Closely Knit in Scarlett
The Clarrington Heritage
Comics
The Adapter (sci-fi comic with Fernando H. Ramirez)
Story collections
Crazy Quilt: The Best Short Stories Of Ardath Mayhar
Mean Little Old Lady at Work: The Selected Works of Ardath Mayhar
The Methodist Bobcat and Other Tales (tales of East Texas)
Slewfoot Sally and the Flying Mule ('tall tales' of Cotton County, East Texas)
The Loquat Eyes: More Tall Tales from Cotton County, Texas
Strange Doin's in the Pine Hills: stories of fantasy and mystery in East Texas (dark and weird tales of East Texas)
Dark Regions (horror stories collection)
The Crystal Skull (horror stories collection)
A World of Weirdities: Tales to Shiver (weird tales)

Non-fiction
Through a Stone Wall: Lessons from Thirty Years of Writing
Strange View from a Skewed Orbit (autobiography)
Short and critical articles
"Creating Fantasy Folk" in the advice anthology How to write tales of horror, fantasy & science, 1987. 
"On Fantasy vs. SF writing", in the journal Quantum, Summer 1990.
"The Analog 'We'", in Thrust magazine (Spring 1988). (Makes the case that speculative fiction can influence the real world).
"Where Has All The Nonsense Gone?", in Thrust magazine (Winter 1988). (Sets out the need to retain fun, humour and optimism in the face of the changing state of science-fiction and fantasy).

† With Ron Fortier

References

External links

 The Gashta Homepage. Includes a biography & an article Ardath wrote on writing her Fuzzy novel Golden Dream
 Ardath Mayhar works & awards Website co-designed by Mrs. Mayhar, detailing her career as author of novels, articles, short stories and as an artist in watercolor.
 Ardath Mayhar author page Piccadilly Publishing digital publishers of the MOUNTAIN MAJESTY series Mrs. Mayhar wrote under the name of John Killdeer, chronicling the life and times of a young fur trapper in the far west of the 1820s.

1930 births
20th-century American novelists
American children's writers
American horror writers
American science fiction writers
American women short story writers
American women novelists
Novelists from Texas
2012 deaths
American women children's writers
Women science fiction and fantasy writers
Women horror writers
20th-century American women writers
20th-century American short story writers
People from Timpson, Texas
21st-century American women